Pinus teocote (teocote) is a species of conifer in the family Pinaceae.
It is endemic to Mexico. 20–30 m tall and 75 cm diameter. Straight trunk and dense top. Most of the rainfall in its habitat occurs in summer.

The wood is white-yellowish, moderate in quality. The resin is used to produce turpentine.

References

teocote
Trees of Mexico
Trees of Puebla
Trees of Oaxaca
Trees of temperate climates
Flora of the Trans-Mexican Volcanic Belt
Least concern plants
Taxonomy articles created by Polbot
Flora of the Sierra Madre Occidental
Flora of the Sierra Madre Oriental
Trees of Central Mexico